Amir Hamza (3 May 1931 - 23 January 2019) was a Bangladeshi poet, self-proclaimed freedom fighter, and convicted murderer. In recognition of his contribution to literature, he was posthumously awarded the highest civilian medal of Bangladesh, the Independence Award in 2022, which was later reverted on 18 March 2022.

Early life
Amir Hamza was born in Barishaat village of Magura, Bengal Presidency, British India on 3 May 1931. He studied at Barishaat Kazipara Government Primary School and Maheshchandra Pilot High School till class 8.

Criticism
His receiving the award, however, drew widespread criticism. Receiving this highest civilian honor of the country gave rise to discussion and criticism about him in the literary circles. On the face of widespread criticism, the Bangladesh Government assured it will carry out investigations on the recipient. During his lifetime, he only wrote a few poems, which were compiled and was published as a book in 2018, initiated by his son. He is unknown by the mass and in the Bengali literary community. Fiction writer Syed Manzoorul Islam said, “It is not right to comment on a dead person. Those who awarded him must have loved him. However, I have not read any of his books or heard his name." Popular Fiction writer Selina Hossain commented, “Who is he? I don't know him." Historian Muntassir Mamun expressed his frustration and said, “The bureaucrats and deputy secretaries of this country mainly select individuals for this award. This kind of thing happens here because the subject matter experts are not there as selectors.” Hamza's son Asaduzzaman is a Bangladeshi top-bureaucrat and is serving as the Chief Executive Officer of Khulna District Council. His son asaduzzaman lobbying Hamza's name for the award and the then Commerce Secretary Tapan Kanti Ghosh proposed Hamza’s name for the award. For hide the murder conviction his son get punishment from the Government.

Murder conviction

He was the key suspect of murdering Shahadat Hossain Fakir with a spear in 1978.  He was sentenced to life imprisonment but later acquitted on “political grounds” and got out of the jail in 1991 after serving 9 years in prison.

Notes and references

Note

References 

1931 births

2019 deaths

Bangladeshi poets
People from Magura District